This is the list of poets who wrote in  Upper or Lower Sorbian language.

B
Jakub Bart-Ćišinski (Łužičan, Jakub Bart Kukowski) (1856–1909)
Jurij Brězan (1916–2006) – Upper Sorbian

K
Jurij Koch (1936–) – Upper and Lower Sorbian
Mato Kosyk (1853–1940) – Lower Sorbian

L
Kito Lorenc (1938–)

S
Jan Skala (1889–1945)

W
Mina Witkojc (1893–1975) – Lower Sorbian

Z
Handrij Zejler (1804–1872)

See also 
 List of Sorbs

Sorbian